Taavetti (Taavi) Pöyhönen (27 January 1882, Suonenjoki – 5 July 1961) was a Finnish schoolteacher and politician. He was a member of the Parliament of Finland from 1919 to 1922, representing the Social Democratic Party of Finland (SDP).

References

1882 births
1961 deaths
People from Suonenjoki
People from Kuopio Province (Grand Duchy of Finland)
Social Democratic Party of Finland politicians
Members of the Parliament of Finland (1919–22)
Finnish schoolteachers